Okra may refer to:
 Okra (Abelmoschus esculentus), a flowering plant valued for its edible seed pods
 Okra soup
 Other plants known as "okra"
 "Bush okra", also known as Mulukhiyah
 Chinese okra, also known as Luffa
 West African okra, aka Abelmoschus caillei
 Okra, the name in antiquity of Nanos (plateau) in Slovenia
 "Okra" (song), a single by rapper Tyler, the Creator
 Operation Okra, the Australian contribution to the military intervention against ISIL

See also
 Okara (disambiguation)
 Okura (disambiguation)